"Echo" is the third and final single from American rock band Trapt's eponymous debut album.

Music video
The video starts with members of the band plugging in their equipment. It then cuts to Chris Taylor Brown (singer) and a topless woman, who is lying face down, atop of a bed. The video goes back and forth between Brown and the woman lying in bed and images of the woman appearing on the bedding. Then goes into flashbacks of Brown and a girlfriend (played by Michelle Trachtenberg) having sex and having fun with friends at a party. The video comes to its end when Brown puts down his guitar mid-song and runs to find the girlfriend. As he is running, he sees more memories of her in beams of light. It ends when Brown says goodbye to her through a fence and walks away leaving her alone.

The music video was filmed in the mansion at 2218 S Harvard Blvd in Los Angeles, a location frequently used for movies / TV / music videos.

Song versions
There are two versions to the song. One is a production edit which is commonly played and another is a full version. The production edit appears on the album and is 4:11 long (though, on some prints, the song is 4:12). The full version only appears on the single and is 4:36 long. On some album prints, however, the full version is contained. The differences between the two versions are very slight, as the only significant difference is an extended bridge in the full version.

Chart positions

References

2003 singles
2002 songs
Trapt songs
Song recordings produced by Garth Richardson